The 1966 Baylor Bears football team represented Baylor University in the Southwest Conference (SWC) during the 1966 NCAA University Division football season. In their eighth season under head coach John Bridgers, the Bears compiled a 5–5 record (3–4 in SWC, fifth), and were outscored 168 to 140. They played their home games at Baylor Stadium in Waco, Texas.

The team's statistical leaders included Terry Southall with 1,986 passing yards, Richard Defee with 332 rushing yards and 36 points scored, and Tommy Smith with 483 receiving yards. Dwight Hood and Terry Southall were the team captains.

Schedule

References

External links
Game program: Baylor vs. Washington State at Spokane – October 1, 1966

Baylor
Baylor Bears football seasons
Baylor Bears football